Graham Fletcher may refer to:

Graham Fletcher (diplomat), Australian Ambassador to China
Graham Fletcher (equestrian), British Olympian